Icy moons are a class of natural satellites with surfaces composed mostly of ice. An icy moon may harbor an ocean underneath the surface, and possibly include a rocky core of silicate or metallic rocks.  It is thought that they may be composed of ice II or other polymorph of water ice. The prime example of this class of object is Europa.

Icy moons warmed by tides may be the most common type of object to have liquid water, and thus the type of object to possibly have water-based life.

Some icy moons exhibit cryovolcanism, as well as geysers. The best studied example is Saturn's Enceladus.

Orbits
In the case of icy gas giant satellites, an additional requirement is that a moon did not form in the inner region of a proto-satellite disk, which is too warm for ices to condense.

Europa is thought to contain 8% ice and water by mass with the remainder rock.  Jupiter's outer two Galilean moons Ganymede and Callisto contain more ice since they formed further from the hot proto-Jupiter.

Saturn's moon Titan looks and behaves more like Earth than any other body in the Solar System.  Titan is known to have stable pools of liquid methane on the surface.

Images

See also
Ocean planet
Ice planet

References 

Moons
Moon